McCluskie is a surname. Notable people with the surname include:

Gemma McCluskie (1983–2012), English actress
Mike McCluskie (died 1871), American gambler and lawman
Sam McCluskie (1932–1995), British politician

See also
McCluskieganj, a town in Jharkhand, India
McCluskey